The Pontifical Catholic University of Argentina, also known as Catholic University of Argentina ( (UCA), is a private university in Argentina with campuses in the cities of Buenos Aires, Santa Fe, Rosario, Paraná, Mendoza and Pergamino. The main campus is located in Puerto Madero, a modern neighborhoods of Buenos Aires.

It is considered, according to a 2011 study by the Spanish Ministry of Education, as one of the best private universities in Latin America. It is the second university preferred by Argentine employers and the sixth in all Latin America.

Its predecessor, the Catholic University of Buenos Aires (1910–1922), was founded by the Argentine episcopate in 1910, but its degrees, in law, were not recognized by the Argentine government, and the institution was closed in 1922.

In 1955, Decree 6403 concerning the freedom of education enabled the creation of private universities with the authority to deliver academic qualifications. In 1956, the bishops decided to create the Catholic University of Argentina, formally founded on March 7, 1958.

Cardinal Jorge Mario Bergoglio was UCA's Grand Chancellor, by virtue of his office as Archbishop of the Roman Catholic Archdiocese of Buenos Aires, the capital of Argentina, until his election in 2013 as Pope Francis. When Mario Aurelio Poli was named Archbishop of Buenos Aires by Pope Francis later in 2013, he became, ex officio, Grand Chancellor of the University. In May 2013 Pope Francis named Víctor Manuel Fernández, the University's President (the second-highest administrative rank, after the Grand Chancellor), as titular archbishop of Tiburnia.

Accreditation
The part-time MBA program taught by the university has been accredited by the London-based Association of MBAs (AMBA) since 1998.

History

First foundation: the Catholic University of Buenos Aires

Like Buenos Aires itself, the Pontifical Catholic University of Argentina was founded twice. 
The foundation of a catholic university was first discussed in the Eucharistic Congress of 1884. At the time, the Argentine Law 1420 of Common Education had dictated public compulsory, free and secular education in order to guarantee the separation of Church and State and prevent discrimination on the basis of religious adherence.

Eventually the idea lost its momentum, but in 1908 the first Congress of Catholic Youths underlined the importance of a well-rounded, integral education and promoted the foundation of a catholic university "in which students are trained to excel in liberal professions and are taught the core of catholic doctine". The Argentine Episcopate finally decided in favour of this initiative by founding the Catholic University of Buenos Aires in 1910. The bishops proceeded with the conception of this first university regardless of the poor legislation on private institutions of higher education that the country had at the time.

The Faculty of Law was its first and only one, and the curriculum was largely based on those of public universities plus compulsory courses on philosophy and history. The aforementioned lack of legislation conspired against the procurement of official accreditation and the Catholic University of Buenos Aires was forced to close its doors in 1922, little over a decade after being founded.

Second foundation: the Catholic University of Argentina
The Argentine Episcopate decided to found the university once again in its plenum in 1956 and two years later, the Catholic University of Argentina was created.

Once the statutes of the institution were promulgated and approved, the university started receiving students to the original faculties:
 Faculty of Philosophy
 Faculty of Law and Political Science
 Faculty of Social and Economic Sciences

Rankings and reputation
According to the QS World University Rankings, UCA is the third best private university in the country and is ranked second in Buenos Aires.

UCA is widely considered to be one of the best institutions of higher education in Argentina. QS World University Rankings has ranked UCA 2nd overall and 1st among private institutions in Argentina in 2013. The university is also ranked 2nd in terms of employer preference.

UCA is also labeled as a "Top Business School" with 4 out of 5 Palmes by EdUniversal. The French consulting company also ranked UCA's Business School 3rd in the nation.

UCA's main campus is located in Puerto Madero, the financial center of downtown Buenos Aires. It is just 500 meters (546 yards) away from Casa Rosada and 3 lines of the Buenos Aires Underground intersect less than 600 meters away.

Faculties and institutes

In Buenos Aires

Faculties

 Faculty of Arts and Musical Sciences
 Faculty of Agricultural Sciences
 Faculty of Economics
 Faculty of Exact Sciences and Engineering 
 Faculty of Medical Sciences
 Faculty of Social, Political and Communication Sciences
 Institute of Political Science and International Relations
 Institute of Social Communication, Journalism and Advertising
 Faculty of Law
 Faculty of Canon Law
 Faculty of Philosophy and Literature
 Faculty of Psychology and Educational Psychology
 Faculty of Theology

Independent Institutes
 Institute of Bioethics
 Institute of Culture and University Extension
 Institute of Spirituality and Pastoral Action
 Institute for Marriage and Family
 Institute for the Integration of Knowledge
 Institute of Social Sciences Research (IICS)
 CEHAO

In Paraná
 Faculty "Teresa of Avila"

In Rosario
 Faculty of Law and Social Sciences
 Faculty of Economics
 School of Chemical and Engineering "Fray R. Bacon"
 Pergamino Regional Center

In Mendoza
 Faculty of Humanities and Education
 Faculty of Economics "San Francisco"

Main Publications 

 Ancient Near East Monographs
 Antiguo Oriente
 Bridging Cultures
 Damqatum
 Ensayos de Política Económica
 Prudentia Iuris
 Revista de Psicología
 Sapientia
 Temas de Historia Argentina y Americana
 Teología

International UCA
In December 2000, the Office of International Relations was established, renamed to International Relations and Academic Cooperation in 2006, with the aim of promoting the internationalization of all components of the university. From that time the institution increased its links with institutions abroad, including:

America
 Canada: Queen's University, McGill University, Université de Montréal
 USA: Boston College, American University, University of Illinois at Urbana-Champaign, University of Washington (Seattle), University of Arizona, University of North Carolina-Chapel Hill, Georgia Institute of Technology, University of Richmond, University of San Francisco, Washington College, State University of New York at New Paltz
 Mexico: Universidad Anahuac, Universidad de las Americas in Puebla, Universidad de Monterrey
 Panama: Universidad Católica Santa María La Antigua (USMA)
 Colombia: Pontificia Universidad Javeriana, Universidad del Rosario
 Brazil: Universidade de São Paulo (USP), Universidade de Brasília (UnB), PUC-Rio, PUC-SP, PUCRS, PUC-Minas
 Paraguay: Universidad Católica Nuestra Señora de la Asunción
 Chile: Pontificia Universidad Católica de Chile (PUC), Pontificia Universidad Católica de Valparaíso (PUCV)
 Uruguay: Universidad Católica del Uruguay, Universidad de la República

Europe
 Spain: Universidad Pontificia Comillas, Universidad Carlos III, Universidad Rey Juan Carlos, Universitat Politècnica de València, Universidad de Santiago de Compostela
 France: Institut Catholique d'Études Supérieures (I.C.E.S.), Institut de Sciences Politiques (Paris SciencePo), Université Paris Dauphine, Université Paris 5 - René Descartes, Université d'Orléans, Université de Grenoble Pierre Mendès France, Université de Lyon 3, École Supérieure de Commerce de Clermont-Ferrand, École Supérieure Commerce Rouen, Grenoble Ecole Superieure de Commerce, École Supérieure de Commerce Marseille, École Supérieure de Commerce Dijon, Audentia
 United Kingdom: University of Leeds, University of Birmingham, University College London (UCL)
 Italy: Università di Torino, Università Cattolica del Sacro Cuore, Pontifical Lateran University (PUL), Università di Firenze, Università di Pisa, II Università di Roma "Tor Vergata"
 Germany: Universität Tübingen, Universität Mannheim, Technische Universität Darmstadt, WHU – Otto Beisheim School of Management, Frankfurt School of Finance & Management (HfB), Bucerius Law School
 Switzerland: Université de Genève
 The Netherlands: Tilburg University, University of Amsterdam
 Sweden: Lunds Universitet

Asia
 China: Peking University
 South Korea: Sogang University
 Singapore: Singapore Management University (SMU)

Oceania
 Australia: Macquarie University, University of Technology Sydney
 New Zealand: University of Otago, Victoria University of Wellington

Notable professors and researchers 

 Alicia Daneri, Egyptologist.
 Perla Fuscaldo, Egyptologist.
 Alberto Ginastera, Composer
 Marta Lambertini, Composer.
 Santiago Legarre, Lawyer.
 Jorge María Mejía, Cardinal.
 Mario Aurelio Poli, Cardinal.
 Eduardo A. Roca, Lawyer.
 Ariel Edgardo Torrado Mosconi, Bishop.

Notable graduates

 Mauricio Macri, former President of Argentina.
 María Eugenia Vidal, former Governor of Buenos Aires Province.
 Alfonso Prat-Gay, former Minister of the Treasury of Argentina.
 José Luis Machinea, former Minister of Treasury of Argentina.
 Javier González Fraga, former President of the Central Bank of the Argentine Republic. 
 Guillermo Dietrich, former Minister of Transport of Argentina.
 Máxima Zorreguieta, Queen of the Netherlands.
 Soledad Fandiño, an Argentine model and actress.
 Eduardo Costantini, founder and president of the Museum of Latin American Art of Buenos Aires.
 Rafael Grossi General Director of the International Atomic Energy Agency.
 Daniel Hadad CEO of Infobae.
 Alec Oxenford, co-founder of OLX.
 María Julia Alsogaray, was National Deputy for the City of Buenos Aire.
 Ramón Puerta, former Governor of Misiones Province.
 Germán Garavano, former Minister of Justice of Argentina.
 Jorge Sapag, former Governor of Neuquen Province.
 Ricardo Buryaile, former Minister of Agriculture of Argentina.
 Sandra Mihanovich, an Argentine singer and actress.

References

External links
 Official website.
 Centro de Estudios de Historia del Antiguo Oriente (CEHAO)

Argentina
Private universities in Argentina
Catholic universities and colleges in Argentina
Universities in Mendoza Province
Education in Buenos Aires
Educational institutions established in 1958
1958 establishments in Argentina
Universities in Buenos Aires Province
Pontifical Catholic University of Argentina